Sir Edward Waterhouse (1535–1591) was an English-born  Chancellor of the Exchequer of Ireland from 1586 to 1589 and Chief Secretary for Ireland from 1566 to 1567 and again  from 1568 to 1569.

He was born in Helmstedbury, Hertfordshire, the youngest son of John Waterhouse of Whitchurch, Buckinghamshire, auditor to Henry VIII, and his wife Margaret Turner, daughter of Henry Turner of Blunt's Hall, Suffolk. According to family tradition the King saw Edward as a boy and predicted that he would grow up to be a man "fit to serve Princes".  Edward was educated at Oxford, which he entered at the age of just twelve, and then joined the King's Court.

Career 
He started his career as private secretary to Henry Sidney, the Lord Deputy of Ireland, with whom he enjoyed a warm friendship and who employed him in numerous transactions of a highly confidential nature. He acquired land in County Kildare and became a freeman of Carrickfergus, representing the town in the Irish Parliament in 1585. He was also instrumental in obtaining a charter for the town. He then served Sidney's Walter Devereux, 1st Earl of Essex, who was attempting to organise the plantation in County Antrim, until the earl's death. Like Sidney, Essex had great confidence in Waterhouse: on his deathbed, the Earl said a fond farewell to "Ned, my faithful friend". This high opinion of his character was shared by nearly all the English administration in Ireland, and his great charm made him a favourite of Elizabeth I. The Catholic Irish on the other hand long remembered him as the man who had tortured Dermot O'Hurley, the Archbishop of Cashel, by roasting his feet in the fire, in an unsuccessful attempt to make him renounce the Roman Catholic faith. O'Hurley was hanged shortly afterwards.

Waterhouse as a reward for his services received numerous patents and perquisites, of which it seems the most lucrative was bailiff of the River Shannon. The favours showered on him aroused the suspicion of the Queen, who summoned him to London in 1582 to give an account of himself. Fortunately, he had influential friends at Court, and his personal charm quickly won Elizabeth over. He suffered no penalty except the loss of the office of bailiff of the Shannon.

Waterhouse was knighted in 1584 and in 1586 appointed Chancellor of the Exchequer of Ireland, handing over to George Clive in October 1589. He was made a member of the Privy Council of Ireland. He played a major part in the negotiations for the cess, the much-resented tax for the upkeep of garrisons within the Pale, which was eventually abandoned due to the determined opposition of the Anglo-Irish gentry. During the Desmond Rebellions he served with the army in Munster.

Last years and family 

Having long complained of his "weak body", he retired to his estate of Woodchurch in Kent, and died there in 1591. He had married three times, firstly, Elizabeth, daughter of George Villiers of Brooksby Hall, Leicestershire and Joan Harrington, whom he divorced in 1578; secondly, Margaret Spilman, daughter of Thomas Spilman of Great Chart, Kent, who died in 1587, and thirdly, Deborah, widow of a Mr. Harlackenden of Woodchurch, who survived him. He had no children and was succeeded by his grand-nephew Edward.

He is buried with his third wife Deborah at Woodchurch. In the family chapel in Hertfordshire, he erected a memorial to his second wife Margaret, as a token of his "dear love" for that  "worthy lady".

References

1535 births
1591 deaths
16th-century English people
People of Elizabethan Ireland
Chancellors of the Exchequer of Ireland
Irish MPs 1585–1586
Chief Secretaries for Ireland
Members of the Parliament of Ireland (pre-1801) for County Antrim constituencies
People from Hertfordshire
Alumni of the University of Oxford